The Irvington Bowman Apartments is an apartment complex located in northeast Portland, Oregon listed on the National Register of Historic Places.

See also
 National Register of Historic Places listings in Northeast Portland, Oregon

References

1912 establishments in Oregon
Bungalow architecture in Oregon
Irvington, Portland, Oregon
Residential buildings completed in 1912
Apartment buildings on the National Register of Historic Places in Portland, Oregon
Portland Historic Landmarks